Jadwiga Wypyska née Łuszkowska (about 1616 in Lviv – after 20 May 1648 in Merkinė) was a Polish noblewoman, known as the mistress of Polish king Ladislaus IV Vasa.

She was the daughter of merchant Jan Łuszkowski (died 1627) and Anna (died after 1635).

She had a son, Władysław Konstanty Vasa, in 1635, and an unknown daughter, the next year.

In 1637 she married starost of Merkinė, Jan Wypyski (died before 18 December 1647).

References

Sources

 B. Lubosz Opowieści o sławnych kochankach

Mistresses of Polish royalty
Year of death missing
Year of birth uncertain
17th-century Polish people
17th-century Polish women